Wiltshire County Cricket Club was formed in 1893, and first competed in the Minor Counties Championship in 1897.  They have appeared in twenty-two List A matches, making five Gillette Cup, ten NatWest Trophy and six Cheltenham & Gloucester Trophy appearances.  The players in this list have all played at least one List A match.  Wiltshire cricketers who have not represented the county in List A cricket are excluded from the list.

Players are listed in order of appearance, where players made their debut in the same match, they are ordered by batting order.  Players in bold have played first-class cricket.

Key

List of players

List A captains

References

Wiltshire County Cricket Club
Wiltshire
Cricketers